The 2003–04 FA Trophy was the thirty-second season of the FA Trophy.

Preliminary round

Ties

Replays

1st round

Ties

Replays

2nd round

Ties

Replays

3rd round
Burscough as title holders and teams from Football Conference entered in this round

Ties

Replays

4th round

Ties

Replays

5th round

Ties

Replays

Quarter finals

Ties

Replay

Semi finals

First leg

Second leg

Final

References

General
 Football Club History Database: FA Trophy 2003–04

Specific

2003–04 domestic association football cups
League
2003–04